The Falmouth Cutter 34 is a Canadian sailboat that was designed by American naval architect Lyle Hess as a global blue water cruiser and first built in 1982.

Hess considered it the best boat he designed.

Production
The design was initially built in South Africa by Ed McNeil, but production ended after about six boats had been built. The rights were acquired in 2003 by Bryan Gittins, who had done wood work for McNeil. Gittins established Channel Cutter Yachts to build the boat in Ladysmith, British Columbia, Canada, where it remains in production. Rather than ship the large and fragile moulds from South Africa to British Columbia, Gittins had McNeil build one last hull and ship that before destroying the moulds. Gittins then built new moulds from that hull.

Design
The Falmouth Cutter 34 is a recreational keelboat, built predominantly of fibreglass, with extensive wooden decks and trim. It has a cutter rig, with an optional gaff rigged mainsail. The hull has a plumb stem, an angled transom, a keel and transom-hung rudder controlled by a tiller and a fixed long keel. It displaces  and carries  of lead ballast.

The cabin arrangements and accommodation are all custom-built and vary from boat to boat. Depending on the interior finish, the cabin has  of headroom.

Operational history
In a 2010 review by Alvah Simon in Cruising World described sailing the boat, "we tacked effortlessly through mere zephyrs and, with the help of an extended waterline  due  to  the  near-plumb  stem, held  impressive  speeds  of  five  knots  in very light airs. The FC 34 should dash off very respectable  noon-to-noon  runs  under  normal  passage  conditions."

See also
List of sailing boat types

Related development
Falmouth Cutter 22
Falmouth Cutter 26

References

External links

Keelboats
1980s sailboat type designs
Sailing yachts
Sailboat type designs by Lyle Hess
Sailboat types built in South Africa
Sailboat types built by Channel Cutter Yachts